Linda Welch Chapin is a politician in the U.S. state of Florida. She was the first chair of the Orange County Commission, an unsuccessful candidate for the U.S. House of Representatives, and Orange County's first mayor.

Early life
Linda Welch received her early education at the Old Greenwich School in Greenwich, Connecticut and eventually studied political science and journalism at Michigan State University. She met her husband Bruce E. Chapin at Walt Disney's "It's a Small World" attraction at the 1964 World's Fair in New York City. They moved to Orlando, Florida, where she joined, and eventually became president of, the local chapters of both the League of Women Voters and the Junior League. When her children started school, she took a job at a downtown bank.

Political career
In 1985, Chapin was selected by the Orlando Regional Chamber of Commerce to head their "Project 2000", an effort to set millennial goals for the city in the areas of economic development, the arts, and transportation. As this project came to an end, the district's county commissioner retired and Chapin campaigned successfully to win his open seat.

As county commissioner, Chapin pushed for modernization of the county charter, which was completed in 1988 and included the creation of a new position of Chair of the Orange County Commission, to be elected by a county-wide vote. In 1990 Chapin was elected as the first holder of this position.

In 1994, Chapin announced that she would not seek re-election. Her chosen successor, state senator Toni Jennings, declined to run and remained in Tallahassee, leaving two rival commissioners, conservative Tom Dorman and liberal Fran Pignone, competing for the role. In response, Chapin launched a re-election campaign, and won a run-off against Pignone by 61% to 39%.

Chapin's time as Orange County Chair coincided with Glenda Hood's term as Mayor of Orlando, and the two women, along with Jennings and Dianna Fuller Morgan, Walt Disney World's Senior Vice President for Community and Government Relations, were recognized as the prominent figures of the local "old girl network".

On June 25, 1996, Chapin led the Orange County Commission in approving a $53 million subsidy to build a fourth interchange for Walt Disney World on Interstate 4. This spending later sparked a public outcry when it was emerged that the construction project would not be located in Orange County but in neighboring Osceola County. Chapin justified the subsidy by arguing that Disney's billion dollar investment in constructing its Animal Kingdom theme park and the Coronado Springs and Boardwalk resorts would generate tax dollars for Orange County.

Chapin did not seek re-election in 1998 after her second term, and was succeeded by Mel Martinez. She was nominated by acting Governor of Florida Buddy MacKay to complete the unexpired term of Fran Carlton, who had recently resigned as Orange County Clerk of the Courts.

In 2000, when local congressman Bill McCollum announced his candidacy to succeed Connie Mack in the U.S. Senate, Chapin ran for election to fill his vacant seat in the House of Representatives as a Democrat. She raised over $1 million in campaign contributions, more than the combined funds raised by the three Republican candidates: moderate state legislator Bill Sublette, conservative attorney Ric Keller, and military veteran Bob Hering.

Chapin went on to face Keller in the general election that November. The campaign received national attention as a possible flip to the Democrats from the Republican majority in Congress. However, in a historically conservative district, Chapin's Republican opponents characterized her as a liberal opponent of the right to bear arms, and cited her spending $18,500 in county funds for a bronze sculpture of a frog to accuse her of fiscal irresponsibility. Keller eventually won the election by 51% to 49% win over Chapin.

Post-political career
Since leaving elective office, Chapin has served as Director of the Metropolitan Center for Regional Studies at the University of Central Florida. In 2007, she led Orange County's Task Force on Ethics and Campaign Finance Reform, which recommended that local election laws be amended to require all candidates for public office to submit a final list of contributors one week prior to Election Day.

Personal life
Chapin and her husband now live in Belle Isle, Florida. Their son Roger Chapin ran an unsuccessful campaign to unseat incumbent Orlando City Commissioner Vickie Vargo in 2002.

The Linda W. Chapin Theater at the Orange County Convention Center in Orlando was named after her.

References
 "Linda Chapin's legacy of hard battles and great luck," by Jeffrey C. Billman, Orlando Weekly, 25 October 2000.
 "Happy Town," Orlando Weekly, 20 October 2005.
 "Put openness, accountability at forefront in Orange," by Linda Chapin, Orlando Sentinel, 25 November 2007.
 Married to the Mouse: Walt Disney World and Orlando, by Richard E. Foglesong, Yale University Press, New Haven, Connecticut, 2001.  Pages 116, 133-136, 173, 175-179, 188, and 192.

Living people
Michigan State University alumni
Women in Florida politics
County commissioners in Florida
People from Orlando, Florida
People from Orange County, Florida
Year of birth missing (living people)
21st-century American women